George Edwin Mitchell (May 8, 1844 – September 11, 1911) was a Massachusetts politician who served as the fifteenth mayor of Chelsea, Massachusetts.

Early life 
Mitchell was son of Lorenzo Dow and Hannah (Hill) Mitchell.

References
Rand, John Clark: One of a Thousand: a Series of Biographical Sketches of One Thousand Representative Men Resident in the Commonwealth of Massachusetts, A.D. 1888–'89, Volume III, Boston, MA: First National Publishing Company, (1890).

External links
 Mayors of Chelsea 1857 – 1991.

Notes

1844 births
1911 deaths
People of Massachusetts in the American Civil War
Mayors of Chelsea, Massachusetts
Politicians from Cambridge, Massachusetts